Nurislam Sanayev (born February 9, 1991, in the Tuvan ASSR, Soviet Union) is a Kazakh freestyle wrestler of Tuva heritage. He represented Kazakhstan at the 2020 Summer Olympics in the men's freestyle 57 kg event. He lost in the semi-finals and he then won his bronze medal match against Georgi Vangelov of Bulgaria.

Earlier, he competed in the men's freestyle 57 kg event at the 2016 Summer Olympics, in which he got eliminated in the repechage. In 2021, he won the gold medal in the 57 kg event at the Matteo Pellicone Ranking Series 2021 held in Rome, Italy.

Personal life 
In 2016, before the summer Olympic Games in Rio de Janeiro, Sanayev converted to Islam and changed his name.

Nurislam is a father, he has two sons.

Nurislam Sanayev also studied law at Al-Farabi Kazakh National University in Almaty.

Controversy
In the 2020 Tokyo Olympics, Sanayev bit his Indian opponent in the semi-final match.
Bite marks were seen on Indian opponent Ravi Dahiya at the end of the game.

References

External links
 

1991 births
Living people
Kazakhstani Muslims
Converts to Islam from Buddhism
Kazakhstani male sport wrestlers
Olympic wrestlers of Kazakhstan
People from Dzun-Khemchiksky District
Wrestlers at the 2016 Summer Olympics
Russian emigrants to Kazakhstan
Tuvan people
World Wrestling Championships medalists
Wrestlers at the 2020 Summer Olympics
Medalists at the 2020 Summer Olympics
Olympic medalists in wrestling
Olympic bronze medalists for Kazakhstan